Sammontana  was an Italian professional cycling team that existed from 1973 to 1974. The team's main sponsor was ice cream manufacturer Sammontana.

Major wins
1973
 Giro dell'Emilia, Franco Bitossi
 Coppa Sabatini, Mauro Simonetti
 Giro del Veneto, Franco Bitossi
1974
 Coppa Sabatini, Wilmo Francioni
 À travers Lausanne, Giuseppe Perletto
 Gran Premio Industria e Commercio di Prato, Fabrizio Fabbri
 Giro di Puglia, Fabrizio Fabbri
 Stage 14 Giro d'Italia, Giuseppe Perletto

References

Defunct cycling teams based in Italy
1973 establishments in Italy
1974 disestablishments in Italy
Cycling teams established in 1973
Cycling teams disestablished in 1974